The channel wing is an aircraft wing principle developed by Willard Ray Custer in the 1920s. The most important part of the wing consists of a half-tube with an engine placed in the middle, driving a propeller placed at the rear end of the channel formed by the half-tube.

Development 
In 1925, Willard Custer had himself observed how very strong winds had managed to lift the roof of a barn. Custer realized that the high velocity of the wind created a lower pressure above the roof while the pressure remained high inside, literally blowing the roof off. This low pressure above/high pressure below is the same phenomenon that allows an airplane wing to provide lift even though in this case the barn itself was obviously not moving.

Custer studied the phenomenon, and by 1928 he had made the first models of a wing with a half-tube-formed section instead of the usual wing profile. This was patented in 1929. Development of the half-tube channel wing was then refined further, and on November 12, 1942, the CCW-1 (Custer Channel Wing 1) airplane was flying for the first time. Custer built additional experimental aircraft; the last one was CCW-5, of which a few were manufactured in 1964.

Functional principle 

Custer's summary of his invention was that the key to the lift created by a wing is the velocity of the stream of air passing over the wing, not the velocity of the airplane itself: It's the speed of air, not the airspeed!

A wing functions because the air over the wing has a lower pressure than the air under it. The conventional aircraft must reach a significant minimum speed before this pressure differential become large enough that it generates sufficient lift to become airborne.

In Custer's channel wing the rotating propeller will direct a stable stream of air backwards through the channel. A propeller will at the low pressure side normally be supplied by air from all directions. Since the half-tube prevents air from being drawn from below, the air will be sucked through the channel instead. This creates a strong low pressure area in the channel, which again generates a lift.

Applications and limitations 
The layout was not successfully proven in an aircraft for a long time, though Custer showed theoretically and experimentally that the principle was capable of vertical flight. Since they were built with conventional rudders needing some minimum airspeed to be functional, none of the aircraft designed by Custer were capable of full vertical takeoff, but instead were characterized as STOL (short takeoff and landing). Full vertical takeoff is theoretically feasible, but would require additional modifications and means of control.

Custer investigated both aircraft with pure channel wings as well as aircraft with additional conventional wings located outside the channels. The construction functions very well at relatively low speeds. At higher speeds, at high propeller RPM, oscillations would occur in the areas around the propeller, causing increased noise as well as creating long term destructive vibrations in the structure.

The twin engine layout featuring two channel wing features was the most tested configuration. The twin layout had a higher risk of loss of control during a single engine failure situation, and required very high nose up attitude for STOL flight compared to conventional twin engine aircraft.

Two of Custer's CCW aircraft survive. The CCW-1 is located at the Smithsonian's National Air & Space Museum in Suitland, Maryland. The CCW-5, which was based on the Baumann Brigadier executive aircraft, is exhibited at the Mid-Atlantic Air Museum in Pennsylvania.

Later, research performed by NASA concluded that the advantage in lift and field length performance achieved did not offset the layout's many deficiencies in climb and high speed ability, and problems meeting certification requirements for general aviation. The main issue is that the semi-circular beam wing configuration incurs increased profile drag and weight penalties over a conventional wing of the same lifting planform, and a common straight wing could provide almost the equivalent lift enhancement when exposed to the same slipstream-induced increased dynamic pressure.

Hybrid Channel Wing 

From 1999–2004 A joint research project led by Georgia Institute of the Technology Research Institute in Atlanta was funded by Langley Research Center. Aircraft were tested using channel wing principle layouts with circulation control devices that leveraged the Coandă effect. Performance of the wing was increased, and angle of attack was lowered, reducing some of the drawbacks of the design. The resultant design has been patented.

Channel wing principle aircraft examples

References

Further reading

External links 
Custer-Channelwing Website Archive
Another Custer Channel Wing Website
Video of Custer explaining his theories and actual flight footage
Pictures of the Custer CCW-1 National Air and Space Museum
Pictures of the Custer CCW-5 Mid-Atlantic Air Museum, Reading, Pennsylvania
Modern channelwing aircraft design Stavatti designed channelwing transport for the 2000s
Custer's Channel Wing

Aircraft wing design
Wing configurations